Ashty (Dargwa: ГIяштти) is a rural locality (a selo) and the administrative centre of Ashtynsky Selsoviet, Dakhadayevsky District, Republic of Dagestan, Russia. The population was 393 as of 2010. There are 6 streets.

Geography 
Ashty is located 50 km southwest of Urkarakh (the district's administrative centre) by road. Khuduts and Kunki are the nearest rural localities.

Nationalities 
Dargins live there.

References 

Rural localities in Dakhadayevsky District